Riccardo Gatti (born 30 March 1997) is an Italian footballer who plays as a defender for  club Catanzaro.

Career
He made his Serie C debut for Reggina on 2 September 2017 in a game against Catanzaro.

On 13 July 2018, he joined Monopoli on loan for the 2018–19 season.

On 7 August 2019, he joined Fano on loan for the 2019–20 season.

On 25 September 2020 he joined Reggiana on a permanent deal.

On 21 October 2020 he made his serie B debut against Ascoli.

On 30 January 2021 he was loaned to Serie C club Catanzaro. On 15 July 2021, he moved to Catanzaro on a permanent basis.

References

External links
 

1997 births
Living people
Sportspeople from Lecco
Italian footballers
Association football defenders
Serie B players
Serie C players
Atalanta B.C. players
Reggina 1914 players
S.S. Monopoli 1966 players
Alma Juventus Fano 1906 players
A.C. Reggiana 1919 players
U.S. Catanzaro 1929 players
Footballers from Lombardy